Saranac may refer to a place name in the United States:
 Saranac, Michigan, a village

New York
 Saranac, New York, a town in Clinton County
 Saranac Lake, New York, a large village in Franklin and Essex counties
 Upper Saranac Lake
 Middle Saranac Lake
 Lower Saranac Lake
 The Saranac Inn at Upper Saranac Lake
 The Saranac River, a river in New York state

Other uses
 USS Saranac, the name of four ships
 Saranac Beer, brewed by the Matt Brewing Company